China Arnold (born March 29, 1980) is an American woman who was convicted of murdering her 28-day old daughter, Paris, by cooking her in a microwave oven. She is currently serving a life sentence.

Case

Murder of Paris Talley
On August 30, 2005, when China Arnold and her children lived with her boyfriend, Terrell Talley, in a housing complex in Dayton, Ohio, there was an argument over Paris's paternity. They got in a fight and her anger turned into violence, after which 28-day-old Paris was placed in a microwave for two minutes. She then removed the baby and put her on the table. Paris died within seconds due to the heat. Medical experts said the baby died after her temperature reached . She had no external burns but did suffer high-heat internal injuries.

Finding Paris cold and stiff with burn marks on her body the next day, her parents took her to the hospital where she was pronounced dead. Arnold told investigators that she had been intoxicated. John Paul Rion, the attorney who represented Arnold at her first trial, said she was intoxicated to the point of blacking out when the child died. Arnold had been convicted of abduction in 2000 and forgery in 2002.

Arrests
Arnold was arrested and subsequently released due to a lack of evidence. She was rearrested in November 2006.

Trials
While in jail awaiting trial, Arnold became sexually involved with her cellmate, Linda Williams, who later testified that Arnold confessed her guilt to her.

First trial
Shortly after Arnold's first trial began in February 2008, Talley said his son had told him that he pulled Paris's lifeless body out of the microwave after a neighbor's boy had put her inside, and the judge declared a mistrial.

Second trial
During the second trial, the mother of the child said to have placed the baby in the microwave testified that her significant other was not at the housing complex when Paris died, and Arnold was convicted of aggravated murder and sentenced to life in prison without the possibility of parole on September 8, 2008. She was incarcerated at the Dayton Correctional Institution.

On November 5, 2010, the Ohio Second District Court of Appeals reversed Arnold's conviction, citing prosecutorial misconduct, and stated that the court erred by not allowing material witnesses to testify in her defense.

Third trial
On May 13, 2011, a jury found Arnold guilty of aggravated murder. Her attorney had argued that the evidence pointed as much to Talley as it did her, but failed to convince the jury. On May 20, Arnold was again sentenced to life in prison without parole, with both the jury and judge rejecting the death penalty option. Her attorney said they would appeal the decision.

In September 2013, Arnold's lawyer requested a new trial in the Second District Court of Appeals, claiming multiple errors were made in her case. In December 2013, the 2nd District Court of Appeals affirmed the conviction. An appeal regarding her life sentence was made citing constitutional questions about double jeopardy, asking the Ohio Supreme Court to reverse the 2nd District Court of Appeals decision and send the case back to the trial court "for re-sentencing", but in May 2014, the Court decided not to take up the appeal.

References

Living people
1980 births
2005 in Ohio
21st-century American criminals
American female murderers
American murderers of children
American people convicted of murder
American prisoners sentenced to life imprisonment
Criminals from Ohio
Filicides in the United States
Infanticide
Incidents of violence against girls
People convicted of murder by Ohio
Prisoners sentenced to life imprisonment by Ohio
People from Dayton, Ohio